Armstrong Pame is an officer of the Indian Administrative Service (IAS) of 2009 batch belonging to Manipur cadre. He belongs to Zeme Naga tribe of the Zeliangrong community from Manipur. Armstrong Pame is a recipient of several awards including India's Most Eminent IAS Officer Award ’2015  and India's distinguished IAS Officers Award 2021. Armstrong Pame is also popularly known as the "Miracle Man" for his initiative in building a 100 km road in one of the most remote parts of the country through public contribution. Armstrong Pame is a Physics (Hons.) graduate from St. Stephen’s College, Delhi University and had also completed  Transformational Leadership Course from Oxford University and Leadership in 21st Century Executive Education Module from Harvard Kennedy School. He is also a Young Global leader of Class of 2018 declared by World Economic Forum. Armstrong Pame is also a motivational speaker at various platforms including TEDx, universities and corporates.

Early life and education 
Armstrong Pame hails from Impa village, Tousem sub-division of Tamenglong district of Manipur and did his schooling till Class 10 in Tamenglong at Pretty Lamb Institute, Christian Grammar School and United Builders School. He then finished his Class 11 and Class 12 from St. Edmund's College, Shillong. After completing his bachelor's degree from St. Stephen's College, Delhi in 2005 he appeared for the Civil Services Examination (CSE) in 2008 and was selected for the Indian Administrative Service (IAS).

The Miracle Man of India 

He has earned the sobriquet ‘Miracle Man’ for building a 100 km road famously known as the "Peoples' Road" connecting Manipur to Nagaland and Assam. This "People's Road" has now been declared as National Highway 137 by the Ministry of Road Transport and Highways.

In August 2012, he initiated public participation to raise over  Rs. 50 lakhs for this purpose through Facebook. For his efforts in building the road with public contribution and volunteers he was invited to Facebook headquarters in California and was also hosted for high tea by Sheryl Sandberg at DAVOS World Economic Forum, 2019.

Awards and recognition 

 Armstrong Pame is a recipient of several awards including India's Most Eminent IAS Officer Award ’2015  and India's distinguished IAS Officers Award 2022.  
 In 2012, he was nominated for CNN-IBN Indian of the Year in Public Service category.
 He was also invited to the talk show Aaj Ki Raat Hai Zindagi (AKRHZ) by the host Amitabh Bachchan in 2015 as the 'hero' of the 9th episode. On the show which was aired on Star Plus he could be seen performing the noted song Give Me Some Sunshine along with the Bollywood actor Boman Irani. 
 He is  declared as young Global Leader of the class of 2018 by the World Economic Forum.

Career 
Armstrong Pame has served in various positions including Sub-Divisional Magistrate in some of the most challenging terrains at Tousem, Tadubi and Paomata. He served as the Deputy Commissioner at Kamjong as its first Deputy Commissioner and later at his native district Tamenglong. He also served as Special Secretary, Planning (R&D), Director, Youth Affairs and Sports in the Government of Manipur. Presently, he is serving as Deputy Secretary, in the Ministry of Information & Broadcasting, Government of India.

Other initiatives 
Armstrong Pame is also the founding curator of the Global Shapers Community, Imphal hub under the World Economic Forum. Armstrong Pame is also a regular TedX Speaker at various universities and public forums including at IIMs, IITs, engineering and other universities like Delhi University, Tata Institute of Social Sciences etc. He has also successfully completed Transformational Leadership Course from Oxford University and Leadership in 21st Century Executive Education Module from Harvard Kennedy School. Armstrong Pame was also widely acclaimed for his initiative of inviting school children every 2nd and 4th Friday to his office and over dinner while as District Collector. This invitation is loved by school children as they get a chance to experience the functioning of DC office and also have a close chat with their Collector sharing their dreams and passions.

References

Indian Administrative Service officers
Year of birth missing (living people)
Living people
People from Tamenglong district
Manipur politicians
Naga people
Indian expatriates in the United States